Eco-terrorism is an act of violence which is committed in support of environmental causes, against people or property.

The United States Federal Bureau of Investigation (FBI) defines eco-terrorism as "...the use or threatened use of violence of a criminal nature against innocent victims or their property by an environmentally-oriented, subnational group for environmental-political reasons, or aimed at an audience beyond the target, often of a symbolic nature." The FBI credited eco-terrorists with US $200 million in property damage between 2003 and 2008. A majority of states in the US have introduced laws aimed at penalizing eco-terrorism.

Eco-terrorism is a form of radical environmentalism that arose out of the same school of thought that brought about deep ecology, ecofeminism, social ecology, and bioregionalism.

History 
The term ecoterrorism was not coined until the 1960s.  However, the history of ecoterrorism precedes that. Although not referred to as ecoterrorism at the time, there have been incidents in history of people using terror to protect or defend the environment. It can be seen in the War of Desmoiselles, or War of the Maidens. The War of the Demoiselles was a series of peasant revolts in response to the new forest codes implemented by the French government in 1827. In May 1829 groups of peasant men dressed in women's clothes and terrorized forest guards and charcoal-makers who they felt had wrongfully taken the land to exploit it. The revolts persisted for four years until May 1832.

This particular instance is considered an act of eco-terrorism due to the fact that the peasants used tactics similar to modern day eco-terrorist groups. The peasants of Ariege masked their identities and committed acts of terror. They specifically targeted government officials who infringed on the rights of the forest. However, this is considered a pre-history rather than an actual act of eco-terrorism due to the fact that the peasants weren't environmentalist. The peasants committed their acts to protect the environment because they felt they had a claim to it due to it being their main source of income and way of life for generations.

Instances of pre-ecoterrorism can also be found in the age of colonialism and imperialism. Native and indigenous people didn't have the same view on land as property that Europeans did. When the Europeans colonized other foreign lands they believed that the natives were not using the land properly. Land was something that was meant to be profited and capitalized off of. Oftentimes natives would engage in warfare to protect their land. This is similar to the way that modern day environmentalists fight to protect land from major corporations aiming to deforest land to build factories. An example of Europeans infringing on the rights of natives can be found in the colonial administration of Algeria. When the French colonized Algeria they took the land from natives because they believed they were not using it properly. Claiming that their nomadic lifestyle as damaging to the environment in order to justify their usurping of the land.  However, the natives of Algeria engaged in battles in order to try and keep their land and lifestyle.

Eco-terrorism, civil disobedience, and sabotage 
Eco-terrorism is often defined as the use of violence carried out to further environmental policy change. Eco-terrorists are willing to inflict emotional and physical distress on their victims if they believe it will further their environmental goals. This more radical version of environmental action is illegal, as compared to its more moderate forerunner of eco-activism which is not illegal and would be classified as a form of civil disobedience and uses protests, sit ins and other civil actions to effect environmental change. Eco-terrorism can also include sabotage in the name of the environment, which is illegal as this includes crimes against property which could lead to harm to humans.  Noting that in the United States, the FBI's definition of terrorism includes acts of violence against property, which makes most acts of sabotage fall in the realm of domestic terrorism.

Sabotage involves destroying, or threatening to destroy, property, and in this case is also known as monkeywrenching or ecotage. Many acts of sabotage involve the damage of equipment and unmanned facilities using arson.

Philosophy
The thought behind eco-terrorism rises from the radical environmentalism movement, which gained currency during the 1960s. Ideas that arose from radical environmentalism are "based on the belief that capitalism, patriarchal society, and the industrial revolution and its subsequent innovations were responsible for the despoliation of nature". Radical environmentalism is also characterized by the belief that human society is responsible for the depletion of the environment and, if current society is left unchecked, will lead to the ultimate complete degradation of the environment.

Like deep ecologists, some eco-terrorists subscribe to the idea of biocentrism, which is described as "a belief that human beings are just an ordinary member of the biological community" and that all living things should have rights and deserve protection under the law. Other eco-terrorists are motivated by different aspects of deep ecology, like the goal to return the environment to its "natural", i.e., pre-industrial, state.

Examples of tactics
There are a wide variety of tactics used by eco-terrorists and groups associated with eco-terrorism. Examples include:

 Tree spiking is a common tactic that was first used by members of Earth First! in 1984. Tree spiking involves hammering small spikes into the trunk of a tree that may be logged with the intention of damaging the chainsaw or mill blades. This may also seriously injure the logger. Only one case of serious injury has been widely reported.
 Arson is a tactic most associated with recent activity in the Earth Liberation Front (ELF). The ELF has been attributed with arsons of sites such as housing developments, SUV dealerships, and chain stores. 
 Bombing, while rare, has been used by eco-terrorists. For example, the Superphénix construction site was attacked with anti-tank rockets (RPG-7).
Monkeywrenching is a tactic popularized by Edward Abbey in his book The Monkey Wrench Gang that involves sabotaging equipment that is environmentally damaging.

Notable individuals convicted of eco-terrorist crimes
 Tre Arrow
Dave Foreman –  arrested by the FBI for conspiracy to sabotage a powerline that fed a water pumping station
 James Lee
 Wiebo Ludwig – accused several times for sabotaging oil and gas wells in Alberta, Canada
 Ted Kaczynski
 Jeff Luers
 Marius Mason
 Daniel McGowan – convicted of participation in an arson at a lumber company

Groups accused
Organizations accused of eco-terrorism are generally grassroots organizations, do not have a hierarchal structure, and typically favor direct action approaches to their goals.

Stefan Leader characterizes these groups, namely ELF, with having "leaderless resistance" which he describes as "a technique by which terrorist groups can carry out violent acts while reducing the risk of infiltration by law enforcement elements. The basic principle of leaderless resistance is that there is no centralized authority or chain-of-command." Essentially this consists of independent cells which operate autonomously, sharing goals, but having no central leaders or formal organizational structure. Those who wish to join are typically encouraged to start their own cell, rather than seek out other members and jeopardize their secrecy.

Organizations in the United States
Organizations that have been accused of eco-terrorism in the United States include the Animal Liberation Front (ALF), the Earth Liberation Front (ELF),  the Sea Shepherd Conservation Society, Earth First!, The Coalition to Save the Preserves, and the Hardesty Avengers. In 2010, the FBI was criticized in U.S. Justice Department reports for unjustified surveillance (and placement on the Terrorism Watchlist) between 2001 and 2006 of members of animal-rights groups such as Greenpeace and PETA.

In a 2002 testimony to the US Congress, an FBI official mentioned the actions of Sea Shepherd Conservation Society in the context of eco-terrorism.  The Sea Shepherd Conservation Society intervenes against whaling, seal hunting, and fishing operations with direct action tactics. In 1986, the group caused nearly US$1.8 million in damage to equipment used by Icelandic whalers. In 1992, they sabotaged two Japanese ships that were drift-net fishing for squid by cutting their nets and throwing stink bombs on board the boats.

Inspired by Edward Abbey, Earth First! began in 1980. Although the group has been credited with becoming more mainstream, its use of tree spiking during campaigns has been associated with the origins of eco-terrorism. In 1990, Earth First! organizers Judi Bari and Darryl Cherney were injured when a motion-detecting pipe bomb detonated beneath Bari's driver seat. Authorities alleged that the bomb was being transported and accidentally detonated. The pair sued investigators, alleging false arrest, illegal search, slanderous statements and conspiracy. In 2002, a jury found that FBI agents and Oakland police officers violated constitutional rights to free speech and protection from unlawful searches of Earth First! organizers.

The Earth Liberation Front, founded in 1992, joined with the Animal Liberation Front, which had its beginnings in England in 1979. They have been connected primarily with arson but claim that they work to harm neither human nor animal. A recent example of ELF arson was the March 2008 "torching of luxury homes in the swank Seattle suburb of Woodinville". A banner left at the scene claimed the housing development was not green as advertised, and was signed ELF. In September 2009 ELF claimed responsibility for the destruction of two radio towers in Seattle. The FBI in 2001 named the ELF as "one of the most active extremist elements in the United States", and a "terrorist threat." The Coalition to Save the Preserves was mentioned in FBI testimony as a group that was responsible for a series of arsons in Arizona. Using similar tactics to the ELF, they have caused more than US$5 million in damages.

Media reports have tied Ted Kaczynski, also known as the Unabomber, to environmental activists, and say that the 23 injuries and three deaths through letter-bombs were the acts of an independent eco-terrorist. Among those making such accusations were ABC, The New York Times, Time magazine, and USA Today.

A number of "local" organizations have also been indicted under US Federal laws related to eco-terrorism. These include, among others, the group Stop Huntingdon Animal Cruelty.
Another example is the Hardesty Avengers who spiked trees in the Hardesty Mountains in Willamette National Forest in 1984.

In 2008 the Federal Bureau of Investigation said eco-terrorists represented "one of the most serious domestic terrorism threats in the U.S. today" citing the sheer volume of their crimes (over 2,000 since 1979); the huge economic impact (losses of more than US$110 million since 1979); the wide range of victims (from international corporations to lumber companies to animal testing facilities to genetic research firms); and their increasingly violent rhetoric and tactics (one recent communiqué sent to a California product testing company said: "You might be able to protect your buildings, but can you protect the homes of every employee?").

The National Animal Interest Alliance in their animal rights extremism archives compiled a comprehensive list of major animal rights extremist and eco-criminal acts of terrorism since 1983.

US governmental response
Spiking trees became a federal offense in the United States when it was added to the Drug Act in 1988.

Under the Animal Enterprise Protection Act of 1992 it became a federal crime to "cause more than $10,000 in damage while engaged in "physical disruption to the functioning of an animal enterprise by intentionally stealing, damaging, or causing the loss of any property […] used by the animal enterprise." In 2006, this was updated and renamed the Animal Enterprise Terrorism Act by the 109th congress. The updated act included causing personal harm and the losses incurred on "secondary targets" as well as adding to the penalties for these crimes.

In 2003, a conservative legislative lobbying group, the American Legislative Exchange Council (ALEC), proposed the "Animal and Ecological Terrorism Act" which defined an "animal rights or ecological terrorist organization" as "two or more persons organized for the purpose of supporting any politically motivated activity intended to obstruct or deter any person from participating in an activity involving animals or an activity involving natural resources." The legislation was not enacted.

The FBI has stated that "since 2005…investigations have resulted in indictments against 30 individuals." In 2006, an FBI case labeled "Operation Backfire" brought charges of domestic terrorism to eleven people associated with the ELF and ALF.  "The indictment includes charges related to arson, conspiracy, use of destructive devices, and destruction of an energy facility." Operation Backfire was a result of the 1998 burning of a ski resort in Vail, Colorado by the group, "The Family." The incident resulted in $26 million in damages. The FBI joined together with the Bureau of Alcohol, Tobacco, Firearms and Explosives to convict the individuals and any future eco-terrorist groups.

However, the Bush Justice Department, including the FBI, was criticized in 2010 for improper investigations and prosecutions of left-leaning US protest groups such as Greenpeace. The Washington Post reported that the "FBI improperly opened and extended investigations of some U.S. activist groups and put members of an environmental advocacy organization on a terrorist watch list, even though they were planning nonviolent civil disobedience, the Justice Department said Monday."

A report, filed by Inspector General Glenn A. Fine, found the FBI to be not guilty of the most serious charge — according to the Post — that "agents targeted domestic groups based on their exercise of First Amendment rights." The investigation was conducted in response to allegations that the FBI had targeted groups on such grounds during the Bush Administration. The Post continued:

In 2008, Eric McDavid was convicted of plotting to attack several targets including a fish hatchery, a dam, power stations, and cell phone towers. An undercover FBI agent exposed the plan. In addition to McDavid, two others were also convicted.  On March 6, 2008 Eric McDavid was sentenced to 20 years in prison for "conspiracy to damage or destroy property by fire and explosive." United States Attorney McGregor W. Scott stated: "Today's severe punishment of nearly 20 years in federal prison should serve as a cautionary tale to those who would conspire to commit life-threatening acts in the name of their extremist views."

See also
 Agro-terrorism
 Anarcho-primitivism
 Earth Liberation Prisoners Support Network
 Ecofascism
 Ecoterrorism in fiction
 Eco-warrior
 Environmental terrorism
 Green anarchism
 Green Scare
 THERMCON – FBI operation against the "Evan Mecham Eco-Terrorist International Conspiracy" (EMETIC)

References

Further reading
 The History and Impact of Earth First!
 Gagliano Giuseppe, Problemi e prospettive dell'ecologia radicale e dell'ecoterrorismo (Aracne Press, 2012) 
 

 
Green anarchism
Far-left politics
Political slurs
Political neologisms
Environmentalism
Radical environmentalism
Political ecology